Søren Absalon Larsen (April 5, 1871 – January 2, 1957) was a Danish physicist who worked in the field of electroacoustics and is best known for giving his name to the Larsen effect.

Absalon Larsen was originally MSc. Philosophy and taught theology, then he began to study physics. 
He subsequently joined to assist Professor Peter Kristian Prytz in the organization of a new exercise course in electronics for mechanical engineers. He was employed at the Polytechnic college, first as a lecturer, later as a professor of electrical engineering.

More biographical detail exists in the Dansk Biografisk Leksikon and the Nordisk Familjebok, in Danish.

Family

Larsen was the son of farmer and carpenter, later maltster Hans Christian Larsen (1834-1920) and Ingeborg Absalonsen (1833–92).

In 1900, he married Agnes Hedevig Elisabeth Munch (born 11 June 1874 in Haslemere - died 20 September 1953 in Gentofte).

Education
 1896 - 1897: Assistant Professor K. Prytz (Peter Kristian Prytz, 1851-1929)
 1898: Copenhagen University gold medal for thesis on Electrical Conductivities of Amalgamates
 1898 - 1903: Assistant at Polytechnic College Physical Laboratory 
 1903 - 1906: Associate Professor of electrical engineering at the Polytechnic College 
 1906 - 1941: Professor of Electrical Engineering at the Technical University 
 1951: Honorary Doctorate, Technical University of Denmark

Publications
 AC 1 + 2" 1923 (book) 
 Messungen von vagabondierenden Stromen in Gas-und Wasserrohren" 1901 (journal article) ~ Measurement of Stray Electrical Current Effects in Gas and Water Pipes.
 A. Larsen, “Ein akustischer Wechselstromerzeuger mit regulierbarer Periodenzahl für schwache Ströme,” Elektrotech. Z., ETZ 32, pp. 284–285, Mar. 1911.
 WorldCat Entries
 Sagen mod praesten i Vejlby og de sager, der fulgte by Absalon Larsen (Book)
 Telegrafonen og den Traadløse og Opfinderparret Valdemar Poulsen og P. O. Pedersen by Absalon Larsen (Book)
 Naturfredning i Frederiksborg amt by Absalon Larsen (Book)
 Methodical classification of international definitions : A paper read before the special committee on nomenclature, a their meeting in Cologne, March 1913 by Absalon Larsen (Book)
 Om Radioforstyrrelser og Midler derimod (Book)
 The Discovery of electromagnetism made in the year 1820 by H. C. Oersted by Absalon Larsen (Book)

References 

Danish physicists
Danish acoustical engineers
People from Middelfart Municipality
1871 births
1957 deaths